Fazlallah Khunji Isfahani, was a Persian religious scholar, historian and political writer. He was born in 1455 in Shiraz, a city in Fars, a region in southern Iran. His father belonged to the Ruzbihan family, which was descended from the Sufi author Ruzbihan Baqli (died 1209), while his mother belonged to the Sa'idi family. Through both his parents, Khunji belonged to the affluent and influential ulama (clergical class) of Fars, who were respected and protected by the Turkmen Aq Qoyunlu. In 1487, Khunji left Shiraz for the third time for a Hajj. He met Sultan Ya'qub of Aq Qoyunlu near the Sahand mountain and agreed to write the history of Aq Qoyunlu dynasty. When the Safavid shah Ismail I started the Shi'ification of Iran and the persecution of Sunni Muslims, Khunji fled to Transoxiana, where he lived for the rest of his life under the patronage of Timurids and Shaybanids.

Works
 Tarikh-i Alam-ara-yi Amini
 Mihman-Nama-i Bukhara
 Suluk al-Muluk

References

Sources 
 
 
 

15th-century Iranian historians
16th-century Iranian historians
People from Shiraz
Historians from the Timurid Empire
Scholars of the Aq Qoyunlu
Historians of the Aq Qoyunlu